Wellstar Kennestone Hospital (formerly WellStar Kennestone Regional Medical Center) is a major hospital located in Marietta, Georgia, serving most of northern and central Cobb County, Georgia.

Kennestone Hospital opened in June 1950 as a 105-bed-facility.  It was named after Kennesaw Mountain and Stone Mountain. In 1959, the hospital's capacity increased to 300 beds with the opening of the south wing. On June 22, 1988, the nation's first laparoscopic gall bladder removal took place at Kennestone.

In 1993, Kennestone Hospital merged with five other facilities to become Northwest Georgia Health System. The other hospitals were: Cobb, Douglas, Paulding and Windy Hill. In 1998, Northwest became WellStar Health System.

In 2011, Kennestone hospital was upgraded to a Level II trauma center, making it the third level II trauma center in Metro Atlanta.

In early 2013, WellStar Kennestone Hospital was renamed WellStar Kennestone Regional Medical Center.

In 2020, Wellstar Kennestone Regional Medical Center opened a 200+ bed Emergency Department connected by a pedestrian bridge to the main hospital. The new Emergency Department became the largest ER in Georgia and one of the top 5 largest in the United States.

Wrestling star Scott Hall died at this hospital on March 14, 2022.

References

Buildings and structures in Marietta, Georgia
Hospitals in Georgia (U.S. state)